The Millions is a 2019 Nigerian comedy thriller film directed by Toka McBaror and written by Tunde Apalowo. The film stars Ramsey Nouah, Blossom Chukwujekwu, Toyin Abraham in the lead roles. It was one of the most expensive films to be made in the Nigerian cinema with an estimated budget of whopping ₦62 million. The film had its theatrical release in Nigeria on 30 August 2019 and received positive reviews from the critics. The film became a box office success grossing ₦12.5 million worldwide and was the second highest grossing Nigerian film in September 2019 after Kasanova.

Cast 

 Ramsey Nouah as Bem Kator
 Toyin Abraham as Adenike
 Blossom Chukwujekwu as Jerome
 Folusho Kayode as Big Lo
 Etinosa Idemudia as Runs girl
 Nancy Isime as Ivey
Chika Lann as Amaka
 Ayo Makun as Wole Baba
 Ali Nuhu as Sheikh
 Broda Shaggi as party organiser
 Energy Uloko as Goon

Synopsis 
The story revolves around the lives of five guys who come together to carryout the massive money heist in Nigeria. Bem Kator (Ramsey Noauh), a charismatic con man plays the main lead character to successfully launch the heist as planned. But things don't go in the way he would have expected with an interesting climax forms up the crux.

Production 
The principal photography of the film was commenced on 9 January 2019 and was shot for a duration of 17 days in various locations of Nigeria in Kaduna, Abuja and Lagos. The film was produced by former international model Chika Lann who coincidentally made her debut in Nollywood industry as a filmmaker through this project. She also landed a supportive role in the film which also marked her film acting debut.

References

External links 

 

2019 films
2010s comedy thriller films
English-language Nigerian films
Films shot in Nigeria
2019 comedy films
2010s English-language films